Mu Persei, Latinised from μ Persei, is a binary star system in the northern constellation of Perseus. It is visible to the naked eye as a point of light with a combined apparent visual magnitude of +4.16. The distance to this system is approximately 900 light-years based on parallax measurements. It is drifting further away with a radial velocity of +26 km/s.

Mu Persei is a spectroscopic binary with an orbital period of 284 days and an eccentricity of about 0.06. The primary component is a yellow G-type supergiant star. The companion is a B-type star with a class of B9.5

Mu Persei is moving through the galaxy at a speed of 35.6 km/s relative to the Sun. Its projected galactic orbit carries it between 23,900 and 32,400 light-years from the center of the galaxy.

Mu Persei came closest to the Sun 5.6 million years ago when it had brightened to magnitude 3.25 from a distance of 600 light-years.

Naming

References

G-type supergiants
Spectroscopic binaries
Perseus (constellation)
Persei, Mu
Durchmusterung objects
Persei, 51
026630
019812
1303